Cirrhochrista caconalis is a moth in the family Crambidae first described by Charles Swinhoe in 1900. It is found in Australia, where it has been recorded from Queensland.

References

Moths described in 1900
Spilomelinae
Moths of Australia